The Shackleton Range is a mountain range in Antarctica.

The range was named after Sir Ernest Shackleton, leader of the British Imperial Trans-Antarctic Expedition (or "Shackleton's Expedition") of 1914–16.

Surveys
The Commonwealth Trans-Antarctic Expedition (CTAE), which in 1956 saw the range from the air, conducted a ground-level survey of its western part in 1957. The United States Navy photographed the range from the air in 1967. In 1968–69 and 1969–70, the British Antarctic Survey (based at Halley Station) conducted further ground surveys with support from US Navy C-130 Hercules aircraft.

Geology
The Haskard Group and Turnpike Bluff Group rest unconformably on the Archean-Middle Proterozoic Shackleton Range Metamorphic Complex.  The Ordovician-Early Devonian Blaiklock Glacier Group (475 Ma) also unconformably overlies the Shackleton Range Metamorphic Complex.  This group is composed of sandstones and conglomerates, and is unconformably overlain by the Beacon Supergroup.

Features
Geographical features include:

Herbert Mountains

Read Mountains

Du Toit Nunataks

Other features

La Grange Nunataks

Other features

 Aronson Corner
 Baines Nunatak
 Bergan Castle
 Blaiklock Glacier
 Blanchard Hill
 Chevreul Cliffs
 Clarkson Cliffs
 Clayton Ramparts
 Cornwall Glacier
 Crossover Pass
 Flat Top
 Freshfield Nunatak
 Fuchs Dome
 Genghis Hills
 Gordon Glacier
 Guyatt Ridge
 Haskard Highlands
 Honnywill Peak
 Jackson Tooth
 Lewis Chain
 Lindqvist Nunatak
 Lister Heights
 Lord Nunatak
 Lundström Knoll
 MacQuarrie Edge
 M'Clintock Bastion
 Meade Nunatak
 Mount Dewar
 Mount Greenfield
 Mount Haslop
 Mount Homard
 Mount Lowe (Antarctica)
 Mount Pivot
 Mount Provender
 Mount Sheffield
 Mount Skidmore
 Mount Weston
 Mummery Cliff
 Nostoc Lake
 Petersen Peak
 Pioneers Escarpment
 Pointer Nunatak
 Pratts Peak
 Ram Bow Bluff
 Recovery Glacier
 Sauria Buttress
 Shotton Snowfield
 Slessor Glacier
 Stephenson Bastion
 Stratton Glacier
 Turnpike Bluff
 Warden Pass
 Wedge Ridge
 Whymper Spur
 Williams Ridge

References

Mountain ranges of Coats Land